The Nissan NA family of straight-four engines is a series of engines manufactured by Nissan (Nissan Machinery). It is the replacement of the Z series, on which its design is based, and is mostly used in commercial vehicles due to its use of Liquefied petroleum gas for fuel on engines with a "P" suffix code.

NA16S
Engine type: ,  bore and stroke, SOHC
Output:  at 5,000 rpm
Torque:  at 3,200 rpm

Applications
1989–1995 Datsun Truck D21 
1990–1995 Nissan Atlas F22 - F23

NA20P
Engine type: ,  bore and stroke, SOHC
Output:  at 4,600 rpm
Torque:  at 2,400 rpm

1998 update
Output:  at 4,600 rpm
Torque:  at 2,400 rpm

Applications
1990–2015 Nissan Cedric Y31
1993–2009 Nissan Crew K30

NA20S
Engine type: ,  bore and stroke, SOHC
Typical output:  at 5,000 rpm
Torque:  at 3,000 rpm

Applications
1989-1999 Datsun Truck D21,  at 5,000 rpm
1990–1999 Nissan Atlas F22 - F23
1990–1999 Nissan Atlas H40
1990–1999 Nissan Homy / Nissan Caravan E24

References

NA
Straight-four engines
Gasoline engines by model